Fabian Wrede (Peippola, Finland, 20 March 1641 – 6 December 1712) was a Swedish politician.

Biography
An advisor to Charles XI, King of Sweden, he was also a Swedish senator ("riksråd") and Lord Marshal of the Riksdag of the Estates.

In his birthright Baron of Elimäki in Finland, he was created Count of Östanå as a reward for his service in the financial administration of the king.

External links

 http://www.helsinki.fi/ylioppilasmatrikkeli/henkilo.php?id=U283
 http://www.wredes.com/Bas/Wrede/w.g.Fab.htm

1641 births
1712 deaths
17th-century Swedish nobility
Lord Marshals of the Riksdag of the Estates
17th-century Swedish politicians
18th-century Swedish politicians